Dale Robert Mohorcic (born January 25, 1956) is a former relief pitcher in Major League Baseball who played from 1986 to 1990. Mohorcic was a star at Cleveland State University. His first two years, Mohorcic pitched well, having an ERA under 3.00. He holds a major league baseball record of 13 consecutive team games with a relief appearance, which he set from August 6–20, 1986. He was traded on August 30, 1988 to the New York Yankees for Cecilio Guante. He shares the Major League record for most consecutive games pitched at 13 with Mike Marshall.

In a 1987 game against the Milwaukee Brewers, Mohorcic was accused of doctoring the baseball. Umpires found no evidence of wrongdoing at the time, but after the game Mohorcic complained of a sore throat, and was admitted to a hospital where it was discovered that he was suffering internal bleeding as a result of having Crohn's disease and taking the pain reliever naproxen. It was erroneously reported by Peter Gammons that Mohorcic's bleeding was caused by swallowing sandpaper. He lives in Maple Heights, Ohio.

References

External links

Box score of the Mohorcic "sandpaper game"

1956 births
American expatriate baseball players in Canada
American people of Slovenian descent
Baseball players from Cleveland
Cleveland State Vikings baseball players
Columbus Clippers players
Hawaii Islanders players
Indianapolis Indians players
Living people
Lynn Pirates (1983) players
Major League Baseball pitchers
Montreal Expos players
Nashua Pirates players
New York Yankees players
Oklahoma City 89ers players
Portland Beavers players
Salem Pirates players
Texas Rangers players
Tri-C Triceratops baseball players
Victoria Mussels players
People with Crohn's disease
American expatriate baseball players in Italy
Fortitudo Baseball Bologna players